The Parasites is a novel by Daphne du Maurier, first published in 1949.

Plot
This novel is the story of the Delaney family. The Delaneys led complex and frequently scandalous lives; their strange relationship with each other closed their circle to all outsiders; the world in which they lived was sophisticated, gay, and sometimes tragic.

Maria Delaney was a beautiful, successful actress, the wife of Sir Charles Wyndham. Niall Delaney wrote the songs and melodies that everyone sang and played. Celia their sister, generous and charming, took care of their father and delighted in Maria's children. Between Maria and Niall there existed a strange affinity—sometimes physical, sometimes spiritual. They were both subtly aware of it, and so was Sir Charles. Perhaps it was this that impelled Maria's husband to exclaim bitterly:

"Parasites, that's what you are. The three of you. You always have been and you always will be. Nothing can change you. You are doubly, triply parasitic; first, because you've traded since childhood on that seed of talent you had the luck to inherit from your fantastic forebears; secondly, because none of you have done a stroke of honest work in your lives but batten on us, the fool public; and thirdly, because you prey on each other, living in a world of fantasy which bears no relation to anything in heaven or on earth."

1949 British novels
Novels by Daphne du Maurier
Victor Gollancz Ltd books
Novels about actors